God's Country is a 2022 thriller film starring Thandiwe Newton. The film was directed by Julian Higgins.

Premise
A college professor is drawn into an escalating battle of wills after she finds two hunters trespassing on her property.

Cast
Thandiwe Newton as Sandra 
Jeremy Bobb as Wolf
Joris Jarsky as Nathan
Jefferson White as Samuel
Kai Lennox as Arthur
Tanaya Beatty as Gretchen

Reception
 

Brian Tallerico of RogerEbert.com said, "It’s a film that understands both form and content, merging the two in a story that feels less like a piece of suspenseful entertainment and more like a warning." Dennis Harvey of Variety said, "God’s Country (the title of which hints at another running theme of faith and doubt) is admirable for avoiding caricature within conflict, and granting dramatic personae the depth to hesitate before giving in to their angriest first impulses."

References

External links
 

2022 films
2022 thriller films
American thriller films
Films set in Montana
2020s English-language films